Universe Gamemaster's Screen and System, World, and Environ Logs is a 1981 role-playing game supplement published by SPI for Universe.

Contents
Universe Gamemaster's Screen and System, World, and Environ Logs is a package including a 96-page logbook that contains four system logs for mapping the worlds of a particular star system, 112 world logs and 12 environ logs for detailed mapping of specific areas on a planet.

Gamemaster's Screen and System, World, and Environ Logs is a GM's screen and a book of blank logs.

Publication history
Gamemaster's Screen and System, World, and Environ Logs was designed by John H. Butterfield, and was published by Simulations Publications, Inc. in 1981 as a cardstock screen with a 96-page book.

Reception
William A. Barton reviewed Universe Gamemaster's Screen and System, World, and Environ Logs in The Space Gamer No. 48. Barton commented that "if you don't have enough photocopies of the logs – or just want some connected in a book – and can't stand the thought of using anything but a Universe screen for Universe (and the [...] price tag doesn't deter you), you might find this accessory of some value."

References

Gamemaster's screens
Role-playing game supplements introduced in 1981
Science fiction role-playing game supplements